An inverter-based resource (IBR) is a source of electricity that is asynchronously connected to the electrical grid via an electronic power converter ("inverter"). The devices in this category, also known as converter interfaced generation (CIG), include the variable renewable energy generators (wind, solar) and battery storage power stations. These devices lack the intrinsic behaviors (like the inertial response of a synchronous generator) and their features are almost entirely defined by the control algorithms, presenting specific challenges to system stability as their penetration increases, for example, a single software fault can affect all devices of a certain type in a contingency (cf. section on Blue Cut fire below). IBRs are sometimes called non-synchronous generators. The design of inverters for the IBR generally follows the IEEE 1547 and NERC PRC-024-2 standards.

Grid-following vs. grid-forming 
A grid-following (GFL) device is synchronized to the local grid voltage and injects an electric current vector aligned with the voltage (in other words, behaves like a current source). The GFL inverters are built into an overwhelming majority of installed IBR devices. Due to their following nature, the GFL device will shutdown if a large voltage/frequency disturbance is observed.  The GFL devices cannot contribute to the grid strength, dampen active power oscillations, or provide inertia.

A grid-forming (GFM) device partially mimics the behavior of a synchronous generator: its voltage is controlled by a free-running oscillator that slows down when more energy is withdrawn from the device. Unlike a conventional generator, the GFM device has no overcurrent capacity and thus will react very differently in the short-circuit situation. Adding the GFM capability to a GFL device is not expensive in terms of components, but affects the revenues: in order to support the grid stability by providing extra power when needed, the power semiconductors need to be oversized and energy storage added. Modeling demonstrates, however, that it is possible to run a power system that almost entirely is based on the GFL devices.

Features 
Compliance with IEEE 1547 standard makes the IBR to support safety features:
 if the sensed line voltage significantly deviates from the nominal (usually outside the limits of 0.9 to 1.1 pu), the IBR shall disconnect from the after a delay (so called ridethrough time), the delay is shorter if the voltage deviation is larger. Once the inverter is off, it will stay disconnected for a significant time (minutes);
 if the voltage magnitude is unexpected, the inverter shall enter the momentary cessation state: while still connected, it will not inject any power into the grid. This state has a short duration (less than a second).
Once an IBR ceases to provide power, it can come back only gradually, ramping its output from zero to full power.

The electronic nature of IBRs limits their overload capability: the thermal stress causes their components to even temporarily function  at 1-2 times the nameplate capacity, while the synchronous machines can briefly tolerate an overload as high as 5-6 times their rated power.

Vulnerabilities 
New challenges to the system stability came with the increased penetration of IBRs. Incidences of disconnections during contingency events where the fault ride through was expected, and poor damping of subsynchronous oscillations in weak grids were reported.

One of the most studied major power contingencies that involved IBRs is the Blue Cut Fire of 2016 in Southern California, with a temporary loss of more than a gigawatt of photovoltaic power in a very short time.

Blue Cut fire 
The Blue Cut fire in the Cajon Pass on August 16, 2016, has affected multiple high-voltage (500 kV and 287 kV) power transmission lines passing through the canyon, throughout the day thirteen 500 kV line faults and two 287 kV faults. The faults themselves were transitory and self-cleared in a short time (2-3.5 cycles, less than 60 milliseconds), but the unexpected features of the algorithms in the photovoltaic inverter software triggered multiple massive losses of power, with the largest one of almost 1,200 megawatts at 11:45:16 AM, persisting for multiple minutes.

The analysis performed by the North American Electric Reliability Corporation (NERC) had shown that:
 700 MW of loss were caused by the poorly designed frequency estimation algorithm. The line faults had distorted the AC waveform and fooled the software into a wrong estimate of the grid frequency dropping below 57 Hz, a threshold where an emergency disconnect shall be initiated. However, the actual frequency during the event had never dropped below 59.867 Hz, well above the low limit of the normal frequency range (59.5 Hz for the Western Interconnection).
 Additional 450 MW were lost when low line voltage caused the inverters to immediately cease to inject current, with gradual return to operative state within 2 minutes. At least one manufacturer had indicated that injecting the current when the voltage level is below 0.9 pu would involve a major redesign.

As a result of the incident, NERC had issued multiple recommendations, involving the changes in inverter design and amendments to the standards.

References

Sources
 
 
 
  
 
 

Electrical engineering